Petar Palić (born 3 July 1972) is a prelate of the Catholic Church who is currently the bishop of Mostar-Duvno and apostolic administrator of Trebinje-Mrkan since 2020.

Palić descends from the Kosovo Croat family, being born in Pristina. After the graduation from the Faculty of Catholic Theology in Zagreb in 1995, Palić was ordained a priest in 1996 and held various pastoral and administrative posts in the Diocese of Dubrovnik. He was bishop of the Diocese of Hvar-Brač-Vis from 2018 to 2020.

Early life 

Petar Palić was born into a Kosovo Croat family of Catholic faith in Pristina in communist Yugoslavia (present-day Kosovo). His father Anton and mother Zora were from Janjevo. At the time of his birth, his family lived in Ajvalija near Priština. In 1978, his family returned to Janjevo. Palić has four younger brothers: Nikola, Zdravko, Branko and Leopold. The bishop of Dubrovnik Roko Glasnović is his first cousin.

Palić attended elementary school there from 1978 to 1986. Afterwards, he attended a seminary in Skopje (in present-day North Macedonia) from 1986 to 1988, and later in Subotica (in present-day Serbia) from 1988 to 1990, when he graduated. He enrolled at the Catholic Faculty of Theology, University of Zagreb in 1990 and graduated in 1995. His father died in 1994, and his mother moved with him in Zagreb, Croatia in 1995, where his brothers were also living.

Priest 

Palić was ordained a priest of the Diocese of Dubrovnik in Granešina, Zagreb on 1 June 1996. His priestly motto was a sentence from Psalm 23 "Thou I walk through the shadow of death, I will fear no evil." After the ordination, Palić briefly worked as a high school catechist and later held various pastoral administrative posts in the Diocese of Dubrovnik. He was named head of the Catechetical Office of the Diocese of Dubrovnik in 1996, a position he held until 2005. At the same time, from 1995 to 2005 he was a personal secretary to the bishop of Dubrovnik. In 1999 he was appointed a director of the Institute for the Maintenance of Clergy and Other Church Officials, where he served until 2017.

Bishop Želimir Puljić sent him to the Karl-Franzens University in Graz, Austria to study moral theology in 2005, where he earned a doctorate with the thesis "For the culture of life: The commitment of the Church in Croatia to the culture of life, based on the encyclical the Gospel of Life from 1995 to 2005". During his studies, bishop Egon Kapellari of the Diocese of Graz-Seckau entrusted him the parish of Dobl, where Palić served as a vicar until 2008. In 2009, the bishop of Dubrovnik allowed him to stay at the Pontifical Croatian College of St. Jerome to study the Italian language.

Between 2009 and 2011 Palić served as a bishop's vicar for pastoral care, and later as a general vicar between 2011 and 2017. On 25 January 2017, he was elected secretary-general of the Episcopal Conference of Croatia.

Bishop 

On 9 March 2018, Pope Francis appointed him as bishop of the Diocese of Hvar-Brač-Vis. On 30 April 2018, he was consecrated as a bishop by Archbishop Želimir Puljić of Zadar with Bishop Emeritus Slobodan Štambuk of Hvar-Brač-Vis and Bishop Mate Uzinić of Dubrovnik serving as co-consecrators. Palić thus became the first Kosovo Croat to become a bishop.

On 11 July 2020, Bishop Petar was appointed the ordinariate of Mostar-Duvno and Apostolic Administrator of Trebinje-Mrkan. He was installed as bishop of the two Herzegovinian dioceses on 14 September. However, he continued to administer his previous Diocese of Hvar-Brač-Vis.

Palić, who previously held only Croatian citizenship, received the citizenship of Bosnia and Herzegovina on 18 February 2021, after the Council of Ministers of Bosnia and Herzegovina approved his request for citizenship.

On 28 May 2021, Palić was received by Pope Francis in an audience.

Herzegovina Affair 

Palić stated that his position on the dispute between the Franciscan Province of Herzegovina and the Diocese of Mostar-Duvno known as Herzegovina Affair cannot be different from that of the Catholic Church. Palić said in an interview from September 2020, commenting on the issue, that the Church "is not a self-proclaimed organisation of like-minded people nor a volunteer society of sympathizers led by a certain interest, in which anyone does what they think and want", instead, Palić emphasised that the Church is "a communion of christened, established by Christ, under the guidance of Pope and the bishop". Palić further stated that he is grateful to his predecessor Ratko Perić on everything he has done for the two Herzegovinian dioceses and the Church as a whole.

In January 2022, one of the Herzegovinian parishes Crnač near Široki Brijeg, controlled by the friars expelled from the Franciscan Order, choose by a referendum to comply with the papal decree and accept a secular priest as a parish priest. A decision came after the expelled friar died and the parish became priestless. Palić was welcoming in helping to resolve the issue. General vicar of the Diocese of Mostar-Duvno issued an official statement, quoting the canon law and stating that the referendum had no influence on the appointment of a diocesan priest to the parish and that the sole authority on the matter belongs to the bishop.

Medjugorje phenomenon 

Palić visited Medjugorje prior to becoming a bishop of Mostar-Duvno motivated by curiosity, friendly contacts and admiration for the faithful who come there. In an interview from September 2020, Palić emphasised that the revelation ended with the death of the last apostle and after Jesus' end of earthly life. He further stated that "it is not necessary to expect some new revelation that would relate to the fundamental human condition in the connection to salvation and redemption".

On 8 December 2020, Bishop Palić celebrated a mass in the celebration of the Immaculate Conception in Medjugorje, along with Apostolic Visitator Archbishop Henryk Hoser and the parish priest, friar Marinko Šakota, and several other priests. He was invited to celebrate this mass by Hoser, who was given the jurisdiction of the Medjugorje parish by Pope Francis. Palić emphasized that his arrival to Medjugorje shouldn't be interpreted as a recognition of the alleged apparitions which according to Pope Francis still require examination and that the Catholic Church has not recognized the alleged apparitions as authentic.

So far, Palić hasn't made position on Medjugorje public. However, a report from Deutsche Welle stated that Palić holds similar views as his predecessor Perić.

Personal life 

Beside his native Croatian, Palić speaks five other languages: English, German, Italian, Macedonian and Russian.

Notes

References

News articles

Journals 

 

1972 births
Living people
People from Pristina
Kosovo Croats
Kosovan Roman Catholic bishops
Naturalized citizens of Bosnia and Herzegovina
University of Zagreb alumni
University of Graz alumni
Bishops of Mostar-Duvno
Apostolic Administrators of Trebinje-Mrkan
Bishops appointed by Pope Francis
21st-century Roman Catholic bishops in Bosnia and Herzegovina
21st-century Roman Catholic bishops in Croatia